The 2012–13 West Coast Conference men's basketball season began with practices in October 2012 and ended with the 2013 West Coast Conference men's basketball tournament at the Orleans Arena March 6–11, 2013 in Las Vegas. The regular season began in November, with the conference schedule starting at the end of December. 

This was the 62nd season for the conference, and the 24th under its current name as "West Coast Conference". The conference began as the California Basketball Association in 1952, became the West Coast Athletic Conference in 1956, and dropped the word "Athletic" in 1989. After having no changes from 1980 until 2011, the conference will have its second change in three years in 2013. Original conference founder, and a fellow faith-based, private school Pacific will rejoin the conference.  Pacific will come from the Big West.

Pre-season
 Pre-season media day was scheduled Monday, October 29, and took place at the Time Warner Cable SportsNet and Time Warner Cable Deportes Studios. Barry Tompkins hosted video interviews through WCCSports.com and Youtube.com beginning at 11:30 AM PDT. Jeff Lampe of WCC Live will also interviewed each coach and get a preview of their respective season. The regional television schedule announcement, the Pre-season Conference team, and the pre-season coaches rankings were some of the additional events that took place.

2012–13 West Coast Men's Basketball Media Poll
Rank, School (first-place votes), Points
1. Gonzaga (7), 63
2. BYU (1), 55
3. St. Mary's (1), 52
4. Loyola Marymount, 37
5. San Diego, 36
6. Santa Clara, 35
7. San Francisco, 19
8. Portland, 15
9. Pepperdine, 12

2012–13 West Coast Men's Preseason All-West Conference Team
Player, School, Yr., Pos.
Gary Bell, Jr., Gonzaga, So., G
Brandon Davies, BYU, Sr., F
Johnny Dee, San Diego, So, G
Matthew Dellavedova, Saint Mary's, Sr., G
Sam Dower, Gonzaga, R-Jr., C
Kevin Foster, Santa Clara, Sr., G
Elias Harris, Gonzaga, Sr., F
Stephen Holt, Saint Mary's, Jr., G
Anthony Ireland, Loyola Marymount, Jr., G
Kevin Pangos, Gonzaga, So., G

Rankings

Non-Conference games
Gonzaga won the 2012 Old Spice Classic.
Saint Mary's finished 3rd at the DirecTV Classic.

Conference games

Composite Matrix
This table summarizes the head-to-head results between teams in conference play. (x) indicates games remaining this season.

Conference tournament

  March 6–11, 2013– West Coast Conference Basketball Tournament, Orleans Arena, Las Vegas, NV.

Bracket

All times listed are Pacific

Head coaches
Dave Rose, BYU
Mark Few, Gonzaga
Max Good, Loyola Marymount
Marty Wilson, Pepperdine
Eric Reveno, Portland
Randy Bennett, Saint Mary's
Bill Grier, San Diego
Rex Walters, San Francisco
Kerry Keating, Santa Clara

Post season

NCAA tournament

NIT

CBI

CiT

Highlights and notes
The Santa Clara Broncos won the 2013 College Basketball Invitational Tournament

Awards and honors

Scholar-Athlete of the Year

WCC Player-of-the-Week

 Nov. 12 – Kevin Foster, G, Santa Clara
 Nov. 26 – Elias Harris, F, Gonzaga
 Dec. 10 – Johnny Dee, G, San Diego
 Dec. 24 – Marc Trasolini, F, Santa Clara
 Jan. 7  – Kelly Olynyk, F, Gonzaga
 Jan. 21 – Kevin Foster, G, Santa Clara
 Feb. 4 – Matt Carlino, G, BYU
 Feb. 18 – Kelly Olynyk, F, Gonzaga
 Mar. 4 - Cole Dickerson, F, San Francisco
 Nov. 19 – Johnny Dee, G, San Diego
 Dec. 3 – Cole Dickerson, F, San Francisco
 Dec. 17 – Brandon Davies, F, BYU
 Dec. 31  – Tyler Haws, G, BYU
 Jan. 14 – Tyler Haws, G, BYU
 Jan. 28 – Beau Levesque, F, Saint Mary's
 Feb. 11 –De'End Parker, G, San Francisco
 Feb. 25 – Matthew Dellavedova, G, Saint Mary's

College Madnesss West Coast Player of the Week

 Nov. 12 – Przemek Karnowski, C, Gonzaga
 Nov. 26 – Elias Harris, F, Gonzaga
 Dec. 10 – Jordan Baker, G, Pepperdine
 Dec. 24 – Marc Trasolini, F, Santa Clara
 Jan. 7  – Kelly Olynyk, F, Gonzaga (Also High Major Player of the Week)
 Jan. 21 – Matthew Dellavedova, G, Saint Mary's
 Feb. 4 – Matt Carlino, G, BYU
 Feb. 18 – Kelly Olynyk, F, Gonzaga
 Mar. 4 - 
 Nov. 19 – Kevin Foster, G, Santa Clara
 Dec. 3 – Cole Dickerson, F, San Francisco
 Dec. 17 – Kelly Olynyk, F, Gonzaga
 Dec. 31  – Tyler Haws, G, BYU (Also High Major Player of the Week)
 Jan. 14 – Tyler Haws, G, BYU
 Jan. 28 – Beau Levesque, F, Saint Mary's
 Feb. 11 – De'End Parker, G, San Francisco
 Feb. 25 – Matthew Dellavedova, G, Saint Mary's

Player-of-the-Month
 November – Kevin Foster, G, Santa Clara
 December – Kelly Olynyk, F, Gonzaga
 January – Kelly Olynyk, F, Gonzaga
 February –

All-Americans

All West Coast Conference teams
Voting was by conference coaches:
Player of The Year: Kelly Olynyk, Gonzaga
Newcomer of The Year: Stacy Davis, Pepperdine
Defensive Player of The Year: Mike Hart, Gonzaga
Coach of The Year: Mark Few, Gonzaga

All-Conference

Honorable Mention

All-Freshman

All-Academic

See also
2012-13 NCAA Division I men's basketball season
West Coast Conference men's basketball tournament
2012–13 West Coast Conference women's basketball season
West Coast Conference women's basketball tournament
2013 West Coast Conference women's basketball tournament

References